The 1986 Open Championship was a men's major golf championship and the 115th Open Championship, held from 17 to 20 July at Turnberry Golf Resort, Scotland. Aided by a 63 in the second round, Greg Norman won his first major championship at even-par, five strokes ahead of runner-up Gordon J. Brand.

It was the second Open at Turnberry, the first was in 1977, the famous "Duel in the Sun" between Tom Watson and Jack Nicklaus. The winning score that year was a record-breaking 268 (–12), twelve strokes lower than Norman's even-par 280 in 1986.

Introduced in 1968, the second cut (at 54 holes) was discontinued after 1985. Also changed in 1986 was the playoff format, to a four-hole aggregate immediately following the final round, rather than 18 holes the following day (and 36 holes prior to 1964).  The new playoff was first used three years later in 1989.

Course

Ailsa Course 

^ The 18th hole was renamed "Duel in the Sun" in 2003.

Previous length of the course for The Open Championship:  
 1977: , par 70

Past champions in the field

Made the cut

Source:

Missed the cut

Round summaries

First round
Thursday, 17 July 1986

Second round
Friday, 18 July 1986

Source:
Amateurs: Davis (+16), Cotton (+18), McGimpsey (+21), Robinson (+22), Curry (+25).

Third round
Saturday, 19 July 1986

Final round
Sunday, 20 July 1986

Source:

References

External links
Turnberry 1986 (Official site)
115th Open Championship - Turnberry (European Tour)

The Open Championship
Golf tournaments in Scotland
Open Championship
Open Championship
Open Championship